Elin Hansson (born 7 August 1996) is a Swedish handballer for SCM Râmnicu Vâlcea and the Swedish national team.

She represented Sweden at the 2020 European Women's Handball Championship.

Achievements 
Swedish Handball League:
Gold Medalist: 2021
Swedish Handball Cup:
Gold Medalist: 2022

References

External links

1996 births
Living people
Swedish female handball players
Handball players at the 2020 Summer Olympics
Olympic handball players of Sweden
21st-century Swedish women